This is a list of Seljuk rulers in Syria (1076–1117).

Aleppo
 Abu Sa'id Taj ad–Dawla Tutush I, 1085–1086
 Jalal ad–Dawlah Malik-Shah I, 1086–1087
 Qasim ad–Dawla Abu Said Aq Sunqur al-Hajib, 1087–1094
 Abu Sa'id Taj ad–Dawla Tutush I (second time), 1094–1095
 Fakhr al-Mulk Radwan, 1095–1113
 Tadj ad–Dawla Alp Arslan al-Akhras, 1113–1114
Lu'lu' al-Yaya, regent as atabeg
 Sultan Shah ibn Ridwan, 1114–1123
Lu'lu' al-Yaya, 1114–1117, regent as atabeg
Shams al-Khawass Yaruqtash, 1117, regent as atabeg
Abu'l–Ma'ali ibn al-Malahi al-Dimashqi, 1117, regent as atabeg.

To the Artuqids under Ilghazi.

Damascus
Atsiz ibn Abaq, 1076–1079
 Abu Sa'id Taj ad–Dawla Tutush I, 1079–1095
 Abu Nasr Shams al-Muluk Duqaq, 1095–1104
 Tutush II, son of Duqaq, 1104
 Muhi ad–Din Baqtash, son of Tutush I, 1104.

Damascus seized by Toghtekin.

Rulers of Syria
Seljuk rulers